Suhaia is a commune in Teleorman County, Muntenia, Romania. It is composed of a single village, Suhaia, but also included Fântânele village until 2004, when it was split off to form a separate commune.

References

Communes in Teleorman County
Localities in Muntenia
Important Bird Areas of Romania